The 2023 Campeonato Paranaense (officially the Campeonato Paranaense 1XBET 2023 for sponsorship reasons) is the 109th edition of the top division of football in the state of Paraná organized by FPF. The competition began on 14 January and will end on 9 April 2023. Coritiba were the defending champions but were eliminated in the quarter-finals.

Format
In the first stage, each team played the other eleven teams in a single round-robin tournament. The teams were ranked according to points. If tied on points, the following criteria would be used to determine the ranking: 1. Wins; 2. Goal difference; 3. Goals scored; 4. Head-to-head results (only between two teams); 5. Fewest red cards; 6. Fewest yellow cards; 7. Draw in the headquarters of the FPF.

Top eight teams advanced to the quarter-finals of the final stages. The bottom two teams were relegated to the second division. Top three teams not already qualified for 2024 Série A, Série B or Série C will qualified for 2024 Série D.

Final stage will be played on a home-and-away two-legged basis, with the best overall performance team hosting the second leg. If tied on aggregate, the penalty shoot-out will be used to determine the winners. Top four teams will qualify for the 2024 Copa do Brasil.

Participating teams

First stage

Final stage

Bracket

Quarter-finals

|}

Group A

Athletico Paranaense qualified for the semi-finals.

Group B

Operário Ferroviário qualified for the semi-finals.

Group C

FC Cascavel qualified for the semi-finals.

Group D

Maringá qualified for the semi-finals.

Semi-finals

|}

Group E

Winners qualify for the finals.

Group F

Winners qualify for the finals.

Finals

|}

Group G

Top goalscorers

References

Paranaense
2023 in Brazilian football